Polygonia satyrus, the satyr comma, is a North American butterfly of the nymphalid family. It is primarily found in western Canada, where it is locally common. It bears a resemblance to Polygonia comma, the eastern comma, with which it is frequently confused.  Its caterpillars feed on Urtica dioica - Stinging Nettle.

External links 

Satyr comma, Butterflies of Canada

Nymphalini
Butterflies of North America
Taxa named by William Henry Edwards
Butterflies described in 1869